Maruthur Gopalan Ramachandran (17 January 1917  24 December 1987), also popularly known as M.G.R., was an Indian politician, actor, philanthropist, and filmmaker who served as the Chief Minister of Tamil Nadu from 1977 until his death in 1987. He was the AIADMK's founder and J. Jayalalithaa's mentor. On 19 March 1988, M.G.R. was posthumously awarded the Bharat Ratna, India's highest civilian honour.

In his youth, M.G.R. and his elder brother M. G. Chakrapani became members of a drama troupe to support their family. Influenced by Gandhian ideals, M.G.R. joined the Indian National Congress. After a few years of acting in plays, he made his film debut in the 1936 film Sathi Leelavathi in a supporting role. By the late 1940s, he had graduated to lead roles.

M.G.R. became a member of the C. N. Annadurai-led Dravida Munnetra Kazhagam (DMK party) and rose through its ranks, using his popularity as a film star to build a political base. In 1972, three years after Annadurai's death, he left the DMK, then led by M. Karunanidhi to form his own party—the All India Anna Dravida Munnetra Kazhagam (AIADMK). Five years later, M.G.R. steered an AIADMK-led alliance to victory in the 1977 election, routing the DMK in the process. He became Chief Minister of Tamil Nadu, the first film actor to become a chief minister in India. Except for a four-month interregnum in 1980, when his government was overthrown by the Union government, he remained as chief minister till his death in 1987, leading the AIADMK to two more electoral wins in 1980 and 1984.

In October 1984, M.G.R. was diagnosed with kidney failure as a result of diabetes. He died on 24 December 1987 in his Ramavaram Gardens residence in Manapakkam after a prolonged illness. M.G.R. is regarded as a cultural icon in Tamil Nadu and is regarded as one of the most influential actors of Tamil cinema. His autobiography Naan Yaen Piranthaen (Why I was Born) was published in 2003.

Early life and background
Maruthur Gopala Ramachandran was born in Kandy, British Ceylon, in the Malayali family of Melakkath Gopalan Menon, a Palakkad Mannadiyar and Maruthur Satyabhama, a Vadavannur Vellalar from Palakkad, in the modern-day state of Kerala. Gopalan Menon died when M.G.R. was just two and a half years old. Just after the death of his father, his sister too died due to ill health. His mother had to struggle alone to bring up M.G.R. and his brother. She took the decision to return to India and went back to Kerala where she failed to get the support of her relatives. With the support of Velu of Kumbakonam, Satyabhama put both her sons in school.

It was in school that M.G.R. started his acting career and joined the Boys Company drama troupe taking part in the rigorous training programmes conducted by the troupe in the areas of singing, dancing, sword fighting, diction and memory with active interest and involvement.

The challenges faced by him during his early life and childhood played an important role in shaping his character and political career. After a brief acting stint overseas with the help of Madras Kandasamy Mudaliar, during which he had played female roles, he returned to India and rejoined the Boys Company and started playing lead roles for the first time.

In his early days, M.G.R. was a devout Hindu and a devotee of Lord Sri Murugan, and his mother's favourite god Lord Sri Guruvayurappan. After joining the DMK, he turned a rationalist.

M.G.R.'s first marriage was to Chitarikulam Bargavi, also known as Thangamani, who died early due to an illness. He later married for the second time, to Satyanandavati, who also died soon after marriage due to tuberculosis. Later M.G.R. married for the third time, this time to V. N. Janaki a former Tamil film actress who was once his leading lady and a future chief minister of Tamil Nadu. M.G.R. had no children from any of his marriages.

Acting career

M.G.R. made his film debut in 1936, in the film Sathi Leelavathi, directed by Ellis R. Dungan, an American-born film director. Generally starring in romance or action films, M.G.R. got his breakthrough in the 1950 film written by M. Karunanidhi. Soon he rose to popularity with the 1954 film Malaikkallan. He acted as hero in the Tamil film industry's first ever full length Gevacolor film, the 1955  Alibabavum 40 Thirudargalum.  He won the National Film Award for Best Actor for the film Rickshawkaran in 1972.

His 1973 blockbuster Ulagam Sutrum Valiban broke the previous box office records of his films. It was one of the few films filmed abroad in those days. It was shot in Singapore, Malaysia, Thailand, Hong Kong and Japan. His acting career ended in 1987 with his last film Ullagam Suthi Paru, in which he acted even though he had been diagnosed with kidney failure. M.G.R. said there was no question of ‘retirement’ for anyone associated in whichever capacity with the cine field.

Mentor 
 Kali N. Rathnam, a pioneer of Tamil stage drama, and K.P. Kesavan were mentors of M.G.R. in his acting career.

Political career
M.G.R. was a member of the Congress Party till 1953, and he used to wear khādī. In 1953  M.G.R. joined the Dravida Munnetra Kazhagam (DMK), or Dravidian Progressive Federation, attracted by founder C. N. Annadurai. He became a vocal Tamil and Dravidian nationalist and prominent member of DMK. He added glamour to the Dravidian movement which was sweeping Tamil Nadu. M.G.R. became a member of the state Legislative Council in 1962. At the age of 50, he was first elected to the Tamil Nadu Legislative Assembly in 1967. After the death of his mentor, Annadurai, M.G.R. became the treasurer of DMK in 1969 after Muthuvel Karunanidhi became the Chief Minister.

1967 assassination attempt
The actor and politician M. R. Radha and M.G.R. had worked in 25 films together. On 12 January 1967, Radha and a producer visited M.G.R. to talk about a future film project. During the conversation, M. R. Radha stood up and shot M.G.R. in his left ear twice and then tried to shoot himself.

After the operation, M.G.R.'s voice changed. Since he had been shot in his ear, M.G.R. lost hearing in his left ear and had ringing problems in the ear. These further surfaced in 1983 when he had kidney problems. When Sinnappa Devar paid his first visit to see M.G.R. at the hospital after the shooting incident he paid M.G.R. an advance for M.G.R.'s next film. After getting released from the hospital and finishing Arasakattalai, M.G.R. acted in Devar's film Vivasaayee against doctors' advice. Due to the operation, M.G.R.'s speaking parts in the film Kaavalkaaran were reduced. This was the only film in which M.G.R. spoke with old and new voices between scenes: M.G.R. was acting in the film Kaavalkaran in 1967 opposite J. Jayalalithaa when the shooting occurred.

Petralthaan Pillaya was the last film of M.G.R.-M. R. Radha together. Shooting ended just few days before M.G.R. was shot. The bullet was permanently lodged in his neck and his voice damaged. Within hours of the shooting, some 50,000 fans had gathered at the hospital where M.G.R. had been taken. People cried in the streets. For six weeks, he lay in the hospital as fans awaited each report of his health. He was visited by a steady stream of commoners and luminaries of film industry, polity and bureaucracy. From his hospital bed, he conducted his campaign for the Madras Legislative Assembly. He won twice the number of votes polled by his Congress rival and the largest vote polled by any candidate for the Assembly.

Differences with Karunanidhi and birth of AIADMK
In 1972, DMK leader Karunanidhi started to project his first son M. K. Muthu in a big way in film and politics, around the same time M.G.R. was accusing that corruption had grown in the party after the demise of C. N. Annadurai. Consequently, M.G.R. was expelled from the party.

Upon his ouster from DMK,his volunteer Anakaputhur Ramalingam started a new party called the Anna Dravida Munnetra Kazhagam.  Joined as a member of that party and became its leader and generel secretary. later renamed All India Anna Dravida Munnetra Kazhagam (AIADMK), the only powerful opponent of the DMK. He mobilised between 1972 and 1977 to spread and preach his party ambition with films like Netru Indru Naalai (1974), Idhayakani (1975), Indru Pol Endrum Vazhga (1977), etc.

Continued success in TN Assembly elections

1977 Assembly elections

The AIADMK contested the 1977 Tamil Nadu Legislative. The election was a four cornered contest between the AIADMK, DMK, the Indian National Congress (INC) and the Janata Party. The AIADMK allied itself with the Communist Party of India (Marxist) (CPIM), while INC(I) and Communist Party  (CPI) contested as allies. The Dravida Munnetra Kazhagam (DMK)and Janata Party (JNP) contested the elections alone. The AIADMK did not field any candidate in the Usilampatti Constituency in support of the All India Forward Bloc leader P.K. Mookiah Thevar. Similarly, the AIADMK also supported the Indian Union Muslim League (IUML) candidate M. Abdul Latheef in the Vaniyambadi Constituency. In the parliamentary elections that occurred just three months prior to these elections, there had been two major alliances – the AIADMK led AIADMK-INC-CPI coalition and the DMK led DMK-NCO-JNP-CPM coalition. But in the months that followed the parliamentary election, these coalitions fell apart. The AIADMK alliance won the elections by winning 144 seats out of 234 and M.G.R. became the Chief Minister of Tamil Nadu. Upon winning the 1977 state elections, M.G.R. became the Chief Minister of Tamil Nadu on 30 June 1977, remaining in office till his death in 1987. In 1979, members of his party Satyavani Muthu and Aravinda Bala Pajanor became the first non-Congress politicians from Tamil Nadu to be ministers in the Union Cabinet. The AIADMK won every state assembly election as long as M.G.R. was alive. Although Annadurai and Karunanidhi had acted in stage plays in trivial roles, in their younger days, before becoming chief minister, M.G.R. was the first popular film actor to be a Chief Minister in India.

1980 Parliament and assembly elections

All India Anna Dravida Munnetra Kazhagam allied with Indian National Congress (Indira) in the 1977 parliamentary election. However, when Janata Party won the election and Morarji Desai became the Prime Minister, M.G.R. extended unconditional support to the Janata party Government. He continued his support to the Charan Singh Government in 1979. After the fall of the Charan Singh government, fresh parliamentary elections were conducted in 1980. Dravida Munnetra Kazhagam struck alliance with INC(I). AIADMK and Janata Party alliance won only 2 seats in Tamil Nadu in that parliamentary election. INC(I) won the election and Indira Gandhi became the Prime Minister.
Congress-DMK victory in the 1980 parliamentary election emboldened their alliance and made them think that people lost their faith in M.G.R. government. DMK pressed the central government to dismiss the Tamil Nadu government using similar allegations used by M.G.R. to dismiss DMK government in 1976. The AIADMK ministry and the assembly were dismissed by the central government and fresh elections conducted in 1980.
Despite their victory at the 1980 Lok Sabha polls, DMK and Indira Congress failed to win the legislative assembly election. AIADMK won the election and its leader and incumbent Chief Minister, M. G. Ramachandran was sworn in as Chief Minister for the second time.

1984 assembly elections

Indira Gandhi was assassinated on 31 October 1984. During the same time, M. G. Ramachandran was diagnosed with kidney failure and admitted into a hospital in New York City. Rajiv Gandhi assumed office immediately and this required a fresh mandate from the people. Indian National Congress (Indira) and Anna Dravida Munnetra Kazhagam formed an alliance and contested the election. M. G. Ramachandran was confined to the hospital. Video coverage of M.G.R. recuperating in hospital along with Indira Gandhi's assassination were stitched together by the AIADMK man in charge of campaigning, R. M. Veerappan. The video was distributed and played across all over Tamil Nadu. Rajiv Gandhi visited cyclone-hit areas in Tamil Nadu, which also boosted the alliance. The sympathy wave created by Indira's assassination, M.G.R.'s illness and Rajiv Gandhi's charisma helped the alliance sweep the election.DMK leader M. Karunanidhi did not contest this election, due to the fact that the AIADMK leader M.G.R. was admitted to a hospital in the U.S. and Indira Gandhi being assassinated. It was a landslide victory for AIADMK-Congress combine which won 195 seats in assembly polls. The electoral victory proved the undying charisma of M.G.R. upon the masses.

Failed Merger Talks with DMK

Karunanidhi claimed on 1 April 2009 and again on 13 May 2012 that M.G.R. was ready for the merger of his party with the DMK in September 1979, with former chief minister of Odisha Biju Patnaik acting as the mediator. The plan failed, because Panruti Ramachandran, who was close to M.G.R. acted as a spoiler and M.G.R. changed his mind.

Criticism and controversies

Even after his death, M.G.R. proved to be very popular in the state and his rule has been cited by many of his contemporaries as best in the country. However, his rule is not without criticism. Economic data under his rule showed that annual growth and per capita income was lower than the national average and the state went from being second among 25 industrialised states in development after Kamaraj's rule to tenth. This decline, according to critics has been due to shift of government resources from power and irrigation to social and agriculture sector according to Madras Institute of Development Studies reported in 1988. In addition, the emphasis on "welfare schemes" such as free electricity to farmers, mid-day meal schemes, etc. has been seen by many as taking money away from infrastructure development that could have benefited the poor. In addition, the liquor tax imposed during his rule was considered to contribute to a regressive tax mostly affecting the poor.

Other criticisms have been on M.G.R.'s centralised decision-making, which many blame for inefficiency and corruption taking hold of his administration. Some examples stated by the critics include Goondas act in 1982 and other acts that limited political criticism in the media, which led to a "police state" during his administration. While these criticisms have been in the minority, supporters of M.G.R. counter that most of these problems were a result of the party members serving M.G.R. rather than the leader himself. While he is not considered a divisive figure in the state, critics and supporters alike agree that his charisma and popularity trumped policy decisions that led to his eventual success during his tenure as chief minister.

Natwar Singh in his autobiography One Life is Not Enough alleges that M.G.R. covertly supported the cause of independent Tamil Eelam and financed the LTTE and their cadres were being given military training in Tamil Nadu. He also alleges that M.G.R. considered Jaffna an extension of Tamil Nadu and without informing the Indian Government at the time, had gifted 4 crore rupees to the LTTE.

M.G.R. has been accused of being intolerant towards the media. In April 1987, the Editor of Ananda Vikatan S. Balasubramanian was sentenced to 3 months in jail by the Tamil Nadu Legislative Assembly for publishing a cartoon, depicting government ministers as bandits and lawmakers as pickpockets, though specific legislature was not specified. But due to media outcry, he was released and S. Balasubramanian later won a case against his arrest. Earlier, Vaniga Otrumai editor A.M. Paulraj was sentenced to 2 weeks imprisonment by the Tamil Nadu Legislative Assembly for his writing.

Bharat Ratna

After his death in 1987, he became the third Chief Minister from the state of Tamil Nadu to receive the Bharat Ratna after C. Rajagopalachari and K. Kamaraj. The timing of the award was controversial, due to the fact that it was given so quickly after his death and he was elected as Chief Minister only 11 years before the award. Many opponents, mostly outside Tamil Nadu, criticised then ruling party INC, under Rajiv Gandhi to have influenced the selection committee to give the award to help win the upcoming 1989 Lok Sabha election. The ruling party forming a coalition with J. Jayalalithaa, the successor to M.G.R. at that time, were able to sweep Tamil Nadu, winning 38 out of 39 seats, INC were however unable to win nationally.

Commemorative coins
To commemorate M.G.R.'s Birth centenary in 2017, the Ministry of Finance, Government of India decided to issue ₹100 and ₹5 coins that would bear his image as a portrait along with an inscription of "Dr. M. G. Ramachandran Birth Centenary".

Philanthropy
He personally offered relief in disasters and calamities like fire, flood, drought, and cyclones. He was the first donor during the war with China in 1962 (Sino-Indian War), donating Rs. 75,000 to the war fund. He was the founder and editor of Thai weekly magazine and Anna daily newspaper in Tamil. He was the owner of Sathya Studios and Emgeeyar Pictures (willed to charity) which produced many of the films he acted in. He had gifted a golden sword weighing half a Kilogram to Mookambika temple in Kollur, Udupi district.

Illness and death

In October 1984, M.G.R. was diagnosed with kidney failure as a result of uncontrolled diabetes, which was soon followed by a mild heart attack and a massive stroke. He was rushed to the Downstate Medical Center in New York City, United States for treatment, undergoing a kidney transplant. Despite his poor health, he did contest the assembly election held later that year while still confined to the hospital, winning from Andipatti. During the election, photos of M.G.R. recuperating in hospital were published, creating a sympathy wave among the people. M.G.R. returned to Madras on 4 February 1985 following his recovery. He was sworn in as Chief Minister of Tamil Nadu for the third consecutive term on 10 February 1985. The next two years and 10 months were spent in frequent trips to the United States for treatment.

M.G.R. never fully recovered from his multiple health problems and died on 24 December 1987 at 3:30 am in his Ramavaram Gardens residence in Manapakkam after his prolonged illness. He was 70 years old, just a month away before his 71st birthday on 17 January 1988. His death sparked off a frenzy of looting and rioting all over the state. Shops, cinemas, buses and other public and private property became the target of violence let loose. The police had to resort issuing shoot-at-sight orders. Schools and colleges immediately announced holidays till the situation came under control. Violence during the funeral alone left 29 people dead and 47 police personnel badly wounded.

His body was kept in state at Rajaji Hall for public to pay their tribute for two days. On 25 December 1987, His remains were buried in the northern end of Marina Beach is now called MGR Memorial which is adjacent to the Anna Memorial.

This state of affairs continued for almost a month across Tamil Nadu. Around one million people followed his remains, around 30 followers committed suicide and people had their heads tonsured. After his death, his political party, the All India Anna Dravida Munnetra Kazhagam, split between his wife V. N. Janaki Ramachandran and J. Jayalalithaa; they merged in 1989.

In 1989 Dr. M. G. R. Home and Higher Secondary School for the Speech and Hearing Impaired was established at the erstwhile residence M.G.R. Thottam, Ramapuram, in accordance with his last will & testament written in January 1987. His official residence at 27, Arcot Street, T. Nagar is now M.G.R. Memorial House and is open for public viewing. His film studio, Sathya Studios, has been converted into a women's college in the name of Dr. MGR-Janaki College of Arts and Science for Women.

Legacy

After his electoral success with in 1977, the DMK has not yet returned to power in Tamil Nadu until his death. On 19 March 1988, M.G.R. was posthumously honoured with Bharat Ratna, India's highest civilian honour. He is widely acknowledged as "Puratchi Thalaivar" (Revolutionary Leader) in Tamil Nadu. One of the major roads in Chennai was named in his honour, Dr. M.G.R. Salai—it was previously called Gokula Kannan Road, and a statue of M. G. Ramachandran now stands there and M.G.R. Nagar, a residential neighbourhood was named after him in Chennai, Salem Central Bus Stand was renamed Bharat Ratna Dr. M.G.R. Central Bus Stand and Omalur Main Road was renamed M.G.R. Salai in Salem, Tirunelveli New Bus Stand was renamed Bharat Ratna Dr. M.G.R. Bus Stand in Tirunelveli and two parks were named Bharat Ratna Puratchi Thalaivar M.G.R. Park and M.G.R. Park in Thoothukudi.

A life-size statue of M. G. Ramachandran was unveiled on 7 December 2006 in the Parliament House by then Lok Sabha Speaker, Somnath Chatterjee in his honour and the function was attended by the former chief minister of Tamil Nadu J. Jayalalithaa and notable politicians.

The central government issued a commemorative coin of ₹ 100 and ₹ 5 denomination to mark the centenary celebrations of him on 17 January 2017 in Chennai.

On 31 October 2017, Government of Tamil Nadu renamed the Mattuthavani Bus Stand in Madurai as M.G.R. Bus Stand to honour him.

On 9 October 2018, Government of Tamil Nadu renamed the Chennai Mofussil Bus Terminus in Chennai as Puratchi Thalaivar Dr. M.G.R. Bus Terminus to honour him.

On 5 April 2019, Government of India renamed the Chennai Central in Chennai as Puratchi Thalaivar Dr. M.G. Ramachandran Central Railway Station to honour him.

On 31 July 2020, Central Metro in Chennai has been renamed as Puratchi Thalaivar Dr. M.G. Ramachandran Central Metro by Government of Tamil Nadu to honour him.

On 17 October 2021, the AIADMK headquarters in Chennai has been renamed as Puratchi Thalaivar M.G.R. Maaligai by party leaders in memory of the party's founder.

In popular culture
Iruvar (1997) by Mani Ratnam is based on the rivalry between M.G.R. and M. Karunanidhi. Malayalam actor Mohanlal played Anandan (M.G.R.)
In the 2019 web series Queen, Indrajith Sukumaran portrayed  G. M. Ravichandran (fictional adaptation of MGR). 
In the film Thalaivii (2021), MGR was portrayed by Arvind Swami.

Filmography

Awards and honours

Honours

Other cinema awards

See also
 M. G. Ramachandran's unrealized projects
First Ramachandran ministry
Second Ramachandran ministry
Third Ramachandran ministry

Notes

References

External links

 
 M.G. Ramchandran: Jewel of the Masses
 
  All about Dr MGR
  MGR Memorial Charitable Trust
 MGR monthly magazine+News portal
 Kandy-born Actor-Politico "MGR" Reigned Supreme in Tamil Nadu Cinema and Politics-by D.B.S. Jeyaraj

M. G. Ramachandran
1917 births
1987 deaths
20th-century Indian film directors
20th-century Indian male actors
Actors from Kandy
Actors in Hindi cinema
Actors in Tamil cinema
Male actors in Malayalam cinema
Best Actor National Film Award winners
Chief ministers from All India Anna Dravida Munnetra Kazhagam
Chief Ministers of Tamil Nadu
Film directors from Chennai
Film producers from Chennai
Filmfare Awards South winners
Indian actor-politicians
Indian Hindus
Indian male film actors
Indian political party founders
Indian Tamil politicians
Kidney transplant recipients
Malayali people
Male actors from Chennai
Tamil Nadu MLAs 1967–1972
Tamil Nadu MLAs 1971–1976
Tamil Nadu MLAs 1977–1980
Tamil Nadu MLAs 1980–1984
Tamil Nadu MLAs 1985–1989
Politicians from Chennai
Recipients of the Bharat Ratna
Recipients of the Padma Shri in arts
Sri Lankan emigrants to India
Tamil film directors
Tamil film producers
Tamil-language film directors
Tamil Nadu State Film Awards winners